Cha is the seventh studio album by Australian band Jo Jo Zep & The Falcons, but first and only to be credited as Jo Jo Zep. It is also the final studio album by the band until Ricochet in 2003. 
The album was released in November 1982 and peaked at number 28 on the Australian Kent Music Report. David Nichols called Cha primarily a "latin-based dance record".

In a 2014 interview with Carol Duncan, Camilleri reflected on the album saying "I had this really beautiful 13-piece band and we went around the country and we had two hit singles... but I wasn't very happy with the record. It could have been so much better and it was my fault that it wasn't as good as I wanted it to be, but anyway, it yielded these two songs and we got to play and I got to do something that I wanted to do which was play with the cha band and six horns and high-heeled boots and gay cavalier and all that nonsense, but it just left me wanting. It was nice, but it wasn't what I wanted to do."

Jo Jo Zep & The Falcons disbanded in 1983.

Reception
Cha was reviewed in January 1983 (Volume 7) of the Countdown Magazine, in which they said the album sees Jo Jo Zep "breaking away from his R&B base and exploring reggae, jazz, techno-pop, Joe Jackson-type big ballads, Caribbean rhythms and more. The result is a heady potpourri, a frothy brew of style and substance." adding "The strong vocal contributions of Jane Clifton give this work a dimension"

Track listing 
Australian track listing

International track listing [1983] (A&M Records)

Charts

References 

1982 albums
Jo Jo Zep & The Falcons albums
Mushroom Records albums